Dancing Stars returned for a second season on September 27, 2009. The show was based on the BBC Worldwide format Dancing With The Stars. It was produced by Slavi Trifonov and was aired on Sundays at 8:00 pm on bTV. It competes with Nova Television's VIP Dance. Started on 10 October, Dancing Stars 2 was aired on Saturdays as well.

The show's new hosts were the actress Elena Petrova and the TV and radio presenter Dimitar Pavlov.

Couples

See also
 Dancing With The Stars
 VIP Dance

References

External links
 Official website of Bulgarian Dancing Stars

2000s Bulgarian television series
2009 Bulgarian television series debuts
2009 Bulgarian television series endings